Munich-Neuperlach Süd (south) station is shared by the Munich S-Bahn and the Munich U-Bahn in the district of Neuperlach in the Bavarian capital of Munich. It is one of the six above-ground stations of the Munich U-Bahn network and the only above-ground station on line U 5. The U-Bahn station was opened on 18 October 1980. The S-Bahn station was opened on 17 December 1977. It has three platforms, two for the U-Bahn and one for the S-Bahn. It is served S-Bahn line S 7, which runs from Kreuzstraße through the center of Munich to Wolfratshausen. Track 1 has a side platform and is used by the U-Bahn services running into the city. Incoming U-Bahn services stop at track 2 on a central platform, which provides cross-platform interchange with the S-Bahn, which stops on track 3. The station is the terminus of U-Bahn line U 5 and is built on a bridge over Carl-Wery-Straße. The station was rebuilt from 2007 to 2009 and now has a new roof, displays and signs. At the end of the station there is a parking area for U-Bahn trains. It has two entrances one east of Carl-Wery-Straße and one to the west. The eastern exit leads to the Siemens ZFE (Central Research and Development) site, once the largest corporate research centre in Europe, employing roughly 14,000 at its peak in the early 1990s.  The same exit leads to a parking lot. The west entrance leads to the bus terminal.

In the late 1980s, it was planned to extend the U 5 to the DASA premises in Ottobrunn. The project was not pursued.

References

Munich U-Bahn stations
Railway stations in Germany opened in 1977
Munich S-Bahn stations
Railway stations in Germany opened in 1980
Ramersdorf-Perlach
Neuperlach Süd